Raúl Arias Arias (born 16 January 2003) is a Spanish footballer who plays as a winger for SD Ponferradina.

Club career
Arias was born in Bembibre, León, Castile and León, and represented CA Bembibre and SD Ponferradina as a youth. He started to feature with the latter's reserves during the 2020–21 season, and scored ten goals in the 2021–22 campaign as the B-side achieved promotion to Tercera Federación.

Arias made his first team debut on 3 September 2022, coming on as a late substitute for Derik Lacerda in a 3–1 Segunda División home loss against Sporting de Gijón.

References

External links

2003 births
Living people
People from El Bierzo
Sportspeople from the Province of León
Spanish footballers
Footballers from Castile and León
Association football wingers
Segunda División players
Divisiones Regionales de Fútbol players
SD Ponferradina B players
SD Ponferradina players